The 1881 Minnesota gubernatorial election was held on November 8, 1881 to elect the governor of Minnesota.

Results

References

1881
Minnesota
gubernatorial
November 1881 events